Maybe may refer to:

Music

Albums
 Maybe (Sharon O'Neill album), 1981
 Maybe, a 1970 album by The Three Degrees

Songs
 "Maybe" (Allan Flynn and Frank Madden song), 1935
 "Maybe" (Brainstorm song), 2001
 "Maybe" (Carmada song), 2014
 "Maybe" (The Chantels song), 1957
 "Maybe" (Emma Bunton song), 2003
 "Maybe" (Enrique Iglesias song), 2002
 "Maybe" (Ingrid Michaelson song), 2009
 "Maybe" (Jay Sean song), 2008
 "Maybe" (Kenny Rogers and Holly Dunn song), 1990
 "Maybe" (Machine Gun Kelly song), 2022
 "Maybe" (N.E.R.D song), 2004
 "Maybe" (No Angels song), 2007
 "Maybe" (Sharon O'Neill song), 1981
 "Maybe" (Sick Puppies song), 2010
 "Maybe" (Teyana Taylor song), 2014
 "Maybe" (Toni Braxton song), 2001
 "Maybe", a song by Birdy from Fire Within, 2013
 "Maybe", a song by Estelle from The 18th Day, 2004
 "Maybe (Duet Version)", a song by Gotthard from Bang!, 2014
 "Maybe", a song by Harry Nilsson, 1969
 "Maybe", a song by Jane Morgan from 1965
 "Maybe", a song by Kelly Clarkson from My December, 2007
 "Maybe", a song by Kid Cudi from Man on the Moon II: The Legend of Mr. Rager, 2010
 "Maybe", a song by The Kid Laroi from F*ck Love, 2020
 "Maybe", a song by Miyuki Nakajima, 1991
 "Maybe", a song by Opshop from Second Hand Planet, 2007
 "Maybe", a song by Secondhand Serenade from Awake, 2007
 "Maybe", a song by Split Enz from Mental Notes, 1975
 "Maybe", a song by Thom Pace from Maybe, 1980
 "Maybe", a song by The Wonder Stuff from Never Loved Elvis, 1991
 "Maybe", a song written in 1926 by George and Ira Gershwin, from the musical Oh, Kay!
 "Maybe", a song written by Martin Charnin and Charles Strouse, from the musical Annie
 "Maybe", a song by Valentina Monetta, representing San Marino in the Eurovision Song Contest 2014
 "May Be", a song by Yiruma from First Love, 2001

Other uses
 Maybe (horse) (born 2009), a Thoroughbred racehorse
 Maybee, Michigan, a village in the United States
 Maybe monad, in functional programming

See also
 
 
 Mabey (disambiguation), the surname
 Maybee (disambiguation)
 Maeby (pronounced "Maybe"), a character in the television series Arrested Development